Nadine Senior (4 October 1939 – 28 January 2016) was the founding principal of the Northern School of Contemporary Dance in Leeds, England.

Personal life
Senior was born Nadine Pickles, in Scarborough, North Yorkshire, on 4 October 1939. She attended Friarage School and the Scarborough Convent Grammar School, and then studied at a college in Leeds.

Professional life

In the late 1950s she had encountered the work of Rudolf von Laban while at teacher training college, and she went on to apply his ideas while teaching PE and holding the position of deputy headmistress at Harehills Middle School in Harehills, Leeds. She introduced all the pupils to dance, saying that "Children are natural movers,"  and "Dance is one of the few art forms where they have the edge over adults, and they can relate to it immediately." Forty of her pupils, mostly male, became professional dancers, including the group of young men who moved on to Intake High School and later formed the Phoenix Dance Theatre and the award-winning choreographer Darshan Singh Bhuller, who would become the company's artistic director.

In 1985 she established the Northern School of Contemporary Dance, which offers degree and postgraduate courses in dance, and also youth and community courses.  She retired in 2001, and was Chair of the Trustees of Phoenix Dance Theatre for the next six years.

She was awarded an MBE for services to dance.

References

1939 births
2016 deaths
Dance teachers
People from Scarborough, North Yorkshire